The Whakamaru Caldera which was created in a massive eruption with a VEI of 8 is approximately  in size and is located in the North Island of New Zealand. It now contains active geothermal areas as well as the later Maroa Caldera.

Geography
The Whakamaru Caldera covers an area larger than the younger Taupō Volcano to its south and indeed the rims overlap. To its north the more recent eruptive centres have sometimes been grouped as the Mokai Ring Complex or Maroa Volcanic Centre. It contains to its north east the more recently active Maroa Caldera with the Ben Lomond Dome being outside the southern border of the Maroa Caldera but definitely a feature of the Whakamaru Caldera.

Geology
The first eruptions may have occurred half a million years ago, but the period 320,000 to 340,000 years before the present have been characterised as:
Whakamaru Eruption
massive eruption sequence over less than a thousand years with a VEI of 8 producing  of tephra about 335,000 years ago (330 - 340 ka).  This age in the most recent literature has slightly moved back to 340 ± 5 ka. This is the largest known in the Taupō Volcanic Zone  and had at least three rhyolytic and one basaltic eruption in its sequence.
Although accumulation of the magma mush may have been over more than 200,000 years there is increasing evidence that eruption only became possible over a period that may have been as short as 10 years through a rapid thermal pulse or pressure change.
From sea core sediment studies it is known that it deposited the widespread Mount Curl/Rangitawa Tephra, dominantly to the southeast (in addition to occurrences northwest), extending across the landmass of New Zealand, and the South Pacific Ocean and Tasman Sea.
Whakamaru ignimbrite
Found over an area of  mainly to west of caldera
Rangataiki ignimbrite
Found mainly to east of caldera 
Mananui eruption (also termed Whakamaru 2 eruption about 330,000 to 320,000 years ago
Mananui ignimbrite found mainly to west of caldera
Te Whaiti ignimbrite found mainly to east of caldera and likely to be same eruptive sequence as Mananui
Paeroa eruption by 320,000 years ago
Paeroa ignimbrite found mainly to east of caldera
The Western Dome Belt eruptions
These represent separate younger magmas that were emplaced over an extended period, from 340,000 to 240,000 years ago

The Maroa Caldera eruptions can be regarded as a separate sequence of rholite eruptions commencing from 305,000 years ago continuing to as recently as 14,000 years ago:
305,000 ± 17,000 oldest Maroa dome
283,000 ± 11,000 Korotai deposits from northern Maroa
275,000 to 240,000 years ago small-scale pyroclastic eruptions
272,000 ± 10,000 Putauaki pyroclastics from a central Maroa source
256,000 ± 12,000 Orakonui pyroclastics from a central Maroa source
251,000 ± 17,000 onward two large parallel dome complexes developed
229,000 ± 12,000 Atiamuri deposits from northern Maroa
220,000 unclear where Mokai ignimbrite that outcrop in some of Maroa area comes from
229,000 to 196,000 Pukeahua deposits and dome building

References 

Rift volcanoes
Whakamaru caldera complex
Taupō Volcanic Zone
Calderas of New Zealand
Pleistocene calderas
VEI-8 volcanoes
Volcanoes of Waikato